Mataruška Banja (lit. "Crithmum Spa") is a spa town located in the City of Kraljevo, Central Serbia. It is located at the Ibar river, 9 km from Kraljevo. As of 2011 census, it has a population of 2,950 inhabitants.

See also 
 List of spa towns in Serbia

References

External links 

Populated places in Raška District
Spa towns in Serbia